John Wellborn Root Jr. (July 14, 1887 – October 24, 1963) was a significant United States architect based in Chicago. He was the son of architect John Wellborn Root. As a young man, he graduated from Cornell University and studied architecture at Paris' École nationale supérieure des Beaux-Arts, where he became friends with John Augur Holabird, the son of another famous Chicago architect.  Root returned to the States and joined his friend on the architectural staff at Holabird & Roche in 1919.

After the deaths of William Holabird in 1923 and Martin Roche in 1927, the firm was reorganized under the new partnership of Holabird & Root.  They worked on many dazzling projects in the late 1920s and early 1930s, before the Great Depression slowed new construction.  These years are notable for the firm's many impressive Art Deco buildings.

The firm weathered the Depression and Root remained an active partner into old age.

Significant buildings
Palmolive Building, 1929
333 North Michigan Building, 1928
Chicago Board of Trade Building, 1930
Chicago Daily News Building, 1929
Chrysler Building at the Century of Progress 1933-34 World's Fair
North Dakota State Capitol, 1934

References 
Bruegmann, Robert.  Holabird & Roche/Holabird & Root: An Illustrated Catalog of Works, 1880-1940.  New York: Garland Publishing, 1991.

External links
Holabird & Root's current website
Holabird & Root Chicago Encyclopedia entry
Holabird & Root Archive at the Chicago Historical Society

1887 births
1963 deaths
Artists from Chicago
Art Deco architects
20th-century American architects
Cornell University alumni
American alumni of the École des Beaux-Arts
Holabird & Root